

Classic Rock Roll of Honour Awards

|-
| 2007 || Kiss Alive! 1975-2000 || Best Reissue || 
|-
| 2008 || Paul Stanley || Showman Award || 
|-

Grammy Awards
The Grammy Awards are awarded annually by the National Academy of Recording Arts and Sciences. Kiss has received one award nomination.

|-
| align="center"|  || "Psycho Circus" || Best Hard Rock Performance || 
|-

Metal Edge Readers' Choice Awards

MTV Video Music Awards
The MTV Video Music Awards is an annual awards ceremony established in 1984 by MTV. KISS has received one nomination.

|-
| align="center"|  ||"All Hell's Breakin' Loose" ||Best Cinematography  || 
|-

People's Choice Awards
The People's Choice Awards is an awards show recognizing the people and the work of popular culture. Kiss has received one award to date, for the song "Beth" in 1977.

|-
| align="center"| 1977 ||"Beth" || Favorite New Song || 
|-

Rock and Roll Hall of Fame

The Rock and Roll Hall of Fame is a museum and award show dedicated to honoring the history and cultural impact of rock and roll. KISS was inducted into the Rock and Roll Hall of Fame on April 10, 2014

|-
| align="center"| 2014 ||  Kiss || Rock and Roll Hall of Fame inductee || 
|-

References

Awards
Lists of awards received by American musician
Lists of awards received by musical group